The Battle of Cassel may refer to one of several battles near the town of Cassel, Nord, France:
 Battle of Cassel (1071) by Robert I of Flanders
 Battle of Cassel (1328) by Philip VI of France
 Battle of Cassel (1347) by John, Duke of Normandy
 Battle of Cassel (1677) by Philippe I of Orléans

Or to one of several battles and sieges involving the city of Kassel (formerly spelled Cassel) in Germany:
 Siege of Cassel (1761) during the Seven Years' War
 Siege of Cassel (1762) during the Seven Years' War
 Battle of Kassel (1813) during the Napoleonic Wars
 Battle of Kassel (1945) during the Second World War